Sara Kjellin  (born 16 December 1977) is a Swedish freestyle skier. She was born in Undersåker in Åre Municipality. She competed at the 2006 Winter Olympics, where she placed fourth in women's moguls. She also at the 1998 Winter Olympics and 2002 Winter Olympics.

References

External links 
 

1977 births
People from Åre Municipality
Living people
Swedish female freestyle skiers
Olympic freestyle skiers of Sweden
Freestyle skiers at the 1998 Winter Olympics
Freestyle skiers at the 2002 Winter Olympics
Freestyle skiers at the 2006 Winter Olympics
Sportspeople from Jämtland County